Albrecht Daniel Thaer (14 May 1752 – 26 October 1828) was a German agronomist and a supporter of the humus theory for plant nutrition.

Biography

Family and early  life 

Albrecht Daniel Thaer was born in Celle, a neat little town in Hanover, on 14 May 1752. His father, Johann Friedrich Thaer, was physician to the Court, and born in Liebenwerda, in Saxony; his mother, Sophie Elisabeth, was the daughter of J. Saffe, receiver of rents and taxes of the district of Celle. Albert was the first born, and had three sisters, Christine, Albertine, and Wilhelmine, of which the first died in infancy, the second was married to Captain Schweppe, and the youngest to the well-known privy councillor, Doctor Jacobi.

At the University of Göttingen he finished his medical studies, and afterwards practised medicine in his native place. In 1786, he married the daughter of a nobleman, one Miss Von Wellich.

The garden attached to his house, where he amused himself with cultivating flowers, gave rise to his agricultural celebrity; the taste for the culture of flowers led him gradually to that of agriculture; he bought a larger lot of sixteen acres, and executed on it his plans. It was soon the attraction of everybody, for the collection of rare plants and beautiful walks, fine orchards, and the different kinds of clover and grass. His success in the culture of various plants, stimulated him to buy a more extensive tract of land.

Early career as physician 
About that time, just when he was at the point of giving up his profession and devoting his time to agriculture alone, he received from London his patent, as physician to his majesty George the Third. This honor came unexpectedly, and he could not withdraw himself at once from his profession, but began by degrees to resign his practice, and continued his favorite occupation, the improvement of agriculture, with the view of establishing an experimental farm. He paid great attention to the culture of herbage fodder, root crops, and especially potatoes; which latter root he most vehemently defended against its numerous adversaries and assailants.

Career as agriculturist 
His work on English husbandry appeared soon after, and was well received in Germany and in England. His fame as an agriculturist who applied science to practice, spread over all Europe. His plan of establishing a school was at last executed, and attracted many visitors of distinction. The king of Prussia Frederick William III was exceedingly anxious to have Thaer's services, invited him to reside within his kingdom, and granted him the following advantages: 
 Nomination as a member of the Academy of Sciences;
 A grant of four hundred acres of land; 
 The privilege of selling the land, and all the privileges attached to a landed estate belonging to a nobleman, in case he should buy another estate;
 Protection to his academy; 
 Entire liberty of the press in regard to his Agricultural Journal; 
 Permission to practice his profession as a physician; 
 His nomination, as privy counsellor.
These privileges and honors were too tempting. He accepted the king's offer, and left Celle for Berlin; took possession of the 400 acres; sold it immediately, and bought the present landed estates Moegelin, and obtained all the privileges of a nobleman.

It was in June, 1804, that he took possession of Moegelin. The loss of his flocks by rot and the French wars, were great calamities, especially in the commencement of his operations; but he conquered all difficulties by perseverance; and in 1806 the academy was opened. Twenty pupils inscribed their names immediately; the number increased with every year. He distinguished himself in the improvement of wool; his flocks were superior to any in Prussia. His written works increased his fame, and the sovereigns of Russia, Prussia and many others sent him their orders of knighthood. He. purchased additional property for his younger son Albrecht Philipp Thaer, the later proprietor of Moegelin, who was entirely devoted to agricultural pursuits.

Death 

In the year 1828, he had a severe attack of rheumatism, and his health began to decline; in 1827, his eyesight failed entirely. His sufferings were great, but he bore them with fortitude and resignation, and at last, on 28 October 1828 in Wriezen, death put an end to his pains.

Thaer is buried in his garden, opposite the family dwelling, on the shore of a small clear pond, among the trees which he planted himself, "his children," as he called them. His tomb is under the eves of a chapel. No cold, huge block of marble tells you that here lies father Thaer; but above his grave rises a pyramid of flowers which with their fragrance arrest the attention of visitors, and point with their rich colored petals to the grave, where the man lies who loved them, and who spent his life among them, watching their mysterious habits, to catch a glimpse of the Great Mother's secret operations. Over his grave the ornaments of nature's rich temple mourn for their departed friend. His consort lies by his side surrounded by shrubs and trees.

Nowadays there is a grave memorial in Möglin in Brandenburg, Germany, see image.

Work 
Albrecht Thaer was the first Agricultural scientist, who arranged the existing facts and theory of agriculture in a proper system. His works are highly valued among all agriculturists, and in his time referred to as a magazine of solid truths.

Thaer's Agricultural School 
The Albrecht-Thaer-Schule in Celle was founded by Thaer early 19th century. In 1802 Thaer had founded in Celle in the "Dammasch-Wiesen", the first German Agricultural Training Institute (today Thaer's Garden ). There among others he experimented with rotation to improve the yield. In 1804, he joined the Prussian service. In the same year he founded the first German Agricultural Academy (Agricultural Academy Möglin) in Möglin manor house. In 1819 the academy was renamed Royal Prussian Academy of agriculture. Among the professors were Georg Ernst Wilhelm Crome from 1808 until 1813, Franz Körte from 1814 to 1830, and Philipp Albrecht Thaer from 1830 until its inclusion in the Berlin Agricultural Training Institute in 1861.

In the year 1804, the King of Prussia had invited Thaer to settle in his dominions, and gave him the estate of Mogelin, situated about forty-five miles from Berlin, consisting of 1,200 acres, to manage as a pattern farm. He erected extensive buildings for himself, three professors, a variety of tradesmen, and the requisite agricultural buildings. The three professors were — one for Mathematics, Chemistry and Geology, one for Veterinary Knowledge, and a third for Botany and Entomology; an experienced agriculturist was also engaged, whose office it was to point out to the pupils the mode of applying the sciences to the practical business of husbandry.

The course commerced in September. During the winter months, the time is occupied in mathematics, and the first six books of Euclid were studied: and in the summer, the geometrical knowledge was practically applied to the measurement of land, timber, buildings, and other objects. The first principles of chemistry were unfolded. By a good but economical apparatus, various experiments were made, both on a large and small scale. For the larger experiments, the brew-house and stilLhouse with their respective fixtures were found highly useful.

Much attention was paid to the analysation of various soils, and the different kinds, with the relative quantity of their component parts, were arranged with great order and regularity. The classification was made with neatness, by having the specimens of soil arranged in order, and distinguished by different colours. Thus, for instance, if the basis of the soil is sandy, the glass has a cover of yellow paper; if the next predominating earth is calcareous, the glass has a white ticket on its side; if it was red clay, it had a red ticket; if blue clay, a blue one. Over these tickets, others, of a smaller size, indicate by their colour the third greatest quantity of the particular substance contained in the soil. This matter may appear to many more ingenious than useful, and savouring too much of the German habit of generalising. The classification of Von Thaer was, however, as much adopted, and as commonly used on the large estates in Germany, where exact statistical accounts were kept, as the classification of Linnaeus in natural history is throughout the civilised world.

There was a large botanic garden, arranged on the system of the Swedish naturalist, kept in excellent order, with all the plants labelled, and the Latin as well as German names. A herbarium, with a good collection of dried plants which was constantly increasing, wa open to the examination of the pupils, as well as skeletons of the different animals, and casts of their several parts, which must have been of great use in veterinary pursuits. Models of agricultural implements, especially of ploughs, were preserved in a museum, which was stored as well with such as were common in Germany, as with those used in England, or other countries.

The various implements used on the farm were all made by smiths, wheelers, and carpenters, residing round the institution; the workshops were open to the pupils, and they were encouraged by attentive inspection, to become masters of the more minute branches of the economy of an estate.

The sum paid by each pupil was four hundred rix-dollars annually, besides which they provide their own beds and breakfasts. In that time in that country, such an expense precluded the admission of all but youths of good fortune. Each has a separate apartment. They were very well behaved young men, and their conduct to each other, and to the professors, was polite, even to punctilio.

Principles of Agriculture, 1809-12 
Thaer's most quoted book is the four volumes Grundsätze der rationellen Landwirthschaft (1809–1812), which was translated into English in 1844 as The Principles of Agriculture by William Shaw and Cuthbert W. Johnson. The humus theory described in this work still received acceptance in the Modern Period (1800–1860).

Von Thaer's "Principles of Agriculture" contain the result of his experience through a series of years. The  work embraces the theory of the soil, the clearing of land, plowing, manuring, and irrigation, hedges and fences, management of meadow and pasture lands; the cultivation of wheat, rye, corn, oats, barley, buckwheat, hops, tobacco, clover, and all the varieties of grasses; the economy of kine stock, breeding and feeding; the management of the dairy, and the use of manures, and the various systems of cultivation, keeping journals and farm records. In brief, it is a complete cyclopedia or circle of practical agriculture.

By the time the book was translated, in 1833, it had been frequently expressed by persons conversant with Foreign agricultural publications, that Von Thaer's Work should not have been translated into English. It was admitted by some of the first agricultural writers, who have read the work in the original language, to contain a great mass of valuable practical matter.

Conception of the agriculturist 
Von Thaer's Agricultural School, Philipp Albrecht Thaer acknowledge in the 1850 programme of his agricultural school, that the object of his institution is to educate capable superintendents, or directors for large estates: but that he cannot call anyone a capable director, who has only the skill to carry out a mode of farming in an imitation or borrowed manner: that he understands by a capable director, a man who can, with a clear discernment, enhance the value of a landed estate entrusted to him so far as circumstances of condition and situation allow it.

A capable director will propose the object to be attained and which may be profitable, prudently, circumspectly, with an exact regard to all the internal and outward relations; and then, prepared with practised eye and tact, rise from one step to another, firm and sure, to the proposed height of culture and productiveness. That in such a course of operations, every visionary scheme and every restless change from one thing to another is to be avoided, is self-evident.

But if we now enquire further, as to the material and elements which are considered necessary to educate anyone to such a capacity, it is needful first—that the agriculturist should understand the general rudiments of all industrial intercourse and those also which belong to the general economy of the state; and these so much the more, as he will always be dependent upon the same. He is obliged, therefore, to fit himself to discern how his own landed estate is related to the whole country; how its politico-social relations and the conjectures of trade may check or aid, operate favorably or disastrously upon his enterprises and their results. Hence he can easily learn to judge, also, how the particular situation of a farm, the nearness or distance of the market, the thoroughfares of trade, the exchange of manufactures, and the present value of money represented by the rate of interest, and, also, by that of the productiveness of mercantile or industrial capital, may impart a greater or less value to his landed property. These will, therefore, be particularly considered, in the exposition of the general doctrine of trade, which treats of the value of capital, the price of products, and the cost of labor.

While thus the agriculturist is led, as it were, from without to the internal economy of landed property, he must further-be so prepared, that he can judge not only of the soil on the same, and the materials contained in it, but also the given degree of richness, and the fit culture. It cannot also escape him, what influences the circumstances of the region exert on vegetable and animal development; and still less ought he to be unacquainted with the physical and moral circumstances of the inhabitants of a country under his inspection and examination.

If we imagine, finally, the agriculturist as in the conduct and management of the farm himself, then we wish him furnished, not only with knowledge but also with ability. He must not only be mentally educated, to conceive an idea, but also be practically certain and skilled in executing it. So, that the thought may be reduced to reality, he must be possessed of a rapid, sharp, sure perception and skill, and with an extensive knowledge of the particular business, instruments, and modes of operation, in the practice of his profession. The agriculturist must, as much as is possible, unite in his own person, the knowledge of art and the manual skill of his branch of business. The more this is the case—the clearer view he can obtain over the whole of the farming operations—so much deeper insight "will he have into the particular parts of the same, into the relation which they bear to each other, the agencies subordinate to himself, and the instruments of the whole system.

To look through this system correctly and regulate it, the agriculturist needs only the aid of a properly arranged and carefully executed' mode of keeping accounts: for as, according to the expression of Thaer the elder, "Account-keeping is the A B C of every trade," so it is wholly and especially the alphabet of agricultural enterprise. Through it, only, the results obtained have a certainty, the relation of the various branches to the whole are represented by numbers; the cause and effect, the means and result, the deficiency and the surplus, are reduced to figures and expressed in money-value.

As the agriculturist is, and continues in an always progressive intercourse with nature and its life; so those scenes are of aid to him, which give him an insight into the powers of nature, its influence on the success or failure of agricultural enterprise, the facility of developing these powers and influences of nature so as to regulate them according to his own wishes as far as it can be done. Hence, it follows, that the knowledge drawn from the domain of the natural sciences ought not to be wanting, in the complete education of. the future director: [steward, or manager, or overseer, as we call him in this country.] As it has been shown how the material and elements must act together, to educate a thorough and an able agriculturist it seems to us, also, that we have, at the same time, shown that while we have in view, as the immediate object of our school, this forming of thorough farmers, we must not limit the object within a narrow space; but make the training which accomplishes the general purpose, such as will enable a young man of a good preliminary education, sound parts and due application, to search still farther and acquire a high degree of information in this trade and science, by books and words.

Commemoration 

The Germans paid due homage to this great man while living, and have not overlooked, as to posthumous honors, him who had rendered such great services to his country and to humanity in general. His statue stands among those of all the great men of Germany.

There are memorials to Thaer in Leipzig, Berlin (Schinkelplatz), Celle, Halle, Möglin, and Kadaň (in front of the agriculture school).

His portrait appeared on the  banknote issued by the Reichsbank from 1929 until 1945. Printing ceased in 1945 but the note remained in circulation until the issue of the Deutsche Mark on 21 June 1948.

A postage stamp in memory of Thaer was issued by East Germany(DDR)  Feb. 8, 1977. At the occasion of his 250th birthday, Germany issued a postage stamp and a postal stationery envelope on May 5, 2002.

Selected publications
Original publications in German, a selection:
 Johann F. Mayer, Albrecht Daniel Thaer (1800). Über die Anlage der Schwemm-Wiesen
 Albrecht Daniel Thaer (1800). Einleitung zur Kenntniß der englischen Landwirthschaft und ihrer neueren practischen und theoretischen Fortschritte. 
 Albrecht Daniel Thaer (1804). Beschreibung der nutzbarsten neuen Ackergeräthe. Volume 2. 
 Albrecht Daniel Thaer (1806). Vermischte landwirtschaftliche Schriften. Volume 3  
 Albrecht Daniel Thaer (1833). Grundsätze der rationellen landwirthschaft. 4 Volumes, (Volumes 3-4)
 Albrecht Daniel Thaer (1810). Annalen des Ackerbaues. Volume 12 
 Albrecht Daniel Thaer (1811). Annalen der Fortschritte der Landwirthschaft in Theorie und Praxis. Volume 2
 Albrecht Daniel Thaer (1811). Handbuch für die feinwollige schaafzucht. 
 Albrecht Daniel Thaer (1815). Leitfaden zur allgemeinen landwirtschaftlichen gewerbslehre. 
 Albrecht Daniel Thaer (1826). Möglinsche Annalen der Landwirthschaft. Volume 17

Translations:
 Albert D. Thaër. Tr. by William Shaw and Cuthbert W. Johnson. The principles of agriculture. London, Ridgway, 1844. 
 Albrecht Daniel Thaer, Augustus Olcott Moore. The Principles of Practical Agriculture Embracing ... A.O. Moore, Agricultural Book Publisher. 1858

About Albrecht Thaer 
 Wilhelm Körte (1839) Albrecht Thaer: Sein Leben und Wirken.

See also
 Statue of Albrecht Thaer, Berlin

References 

Attribution
 This article incorporates public domain material from: United States. Patent Office.

External links 

 Thaer 200 Years at Möglin by Martin Frielinghaus and Claus Dalchow, 2007
 Albrecht Daniel Thaer by Ansgar Vielberg for Echocron (in German)
 Fördergesellschaft Albrecht Daniel Thaer The Thaer Association in Möglin (in German)
 Albrecht-Thaer-Gesellschaft The Thaer Association in Celle (Germany) (in German)
 

1752 births
1828 deaths
German agronomists
People from Celle
People from the Electorate of Hanover
University of Göttingen alumni
19th-century agronomists